János Bánfi (born 9 November 1969) is a former Hungarian footballer who played as a defender.

References

External links
 

1969 births
Living people
Hungarian footballers
Hungary international footballers
Association football defenders
Békéscsaba 1912 Előre footballers
Budapest Honvéd FC players
Vác FC players
S.C. Eendracht Aalst players
Nemzeti Bajnokság I players
Belgian Pro League players
Hungarian expatriate footballers
Hungarian expatriate sportspeople in Belgium
Expatriate footballers in Belgium
People from Újkígyós
Sportspeople from Békés County